Lech Poznań is a Polish football club based in Poznań. This was their 95th season overall. They competed in Ekstraklasa, the highest ranking league in Poland.

Squad

Out on loan

Transfer

Summer transfer window

In

|}

Total spending:  €1,050,000

Out

|}

Total income:  €11,635,000

Total expenditure:  €10,585,000

Winter transfer window

In

|}

Total spending:  €125,000

Out

|}

Total income:  €850,000

Total expenditure:  €725,000

Friendlies

Competitions

Overall

Overview

Goalscorers

Clean sheets

Disciplinary Record

References

Lech Poznan
Lech Poznań seasons